Abdabad may refer to:
 Abdabad, Fars
 Abdabad, Kerman
 Abdabad, Khuzestan
 Abdabad, North Khorasan
 Abdabad, Razavi Khorasan